A Death of Innocence is a 1971 American made-for-television drama film directed by Paul Wendkos.

Plot
A woman attends the murder trial of her daughter.

Cast

Reception
The film was very successful in the ratings being the second most watched movie on U.S. television during 1971 after Brian's Song with a Nielsen rating of 30.8 and an audience share of 55% (the share being more than Brian's Song 48%).

References

External links
 
A Death of Innocence at TCMDB

1971 television films
1971 films
1971 drama films
American courtroom films
CBS network films
Films with screenplays by Joseph Stefano
Films directed by Paul Wendkos
American drama television films
1970s American films